The 2021 Cornell Big Red football team represented Cornell University in the 2021 NCAA Division I FCS football season as a member of the Ivy League. The team was led by eighth-year head coach David Archer and played its home games at Schoellkopf Field. Cornell averaged 4,075 fans per game.

Schedule

References

Cornell
Cornell Big Red football seasons
Cornell Big Red football